was a prominent Japanese photographer during the late-Meiji period.

Maruki opened his first studio in the Uchisaiwaicho district of Tokyo in 1880, and his business continued up until the early 1920s.

In 1888 he was asked to help in producing a new official photograph of the Emperor as the one then in use was ten years old.

References

Sources
 Bennett, Terry. (2006).  Photography in Japan 1853-1912. Tokyo: Tuttle Publishing. 
  Tokyo Metropolitan Museum of Photography, editor. . Kyoto: Tankōsha, 2000.

External links
 Maruki Riyō studio portrait of Kaneko Kentarō (ca. 1904)

Japanese photographers
1854 births
1923 deaths